Vesicularia is a genus of mosses belonging to the family Hypnaceae.

Species
Species adapted from World Flora Online;

Vesicularia acinacifolia 
Vesicularia albo-viridis 
Vesicularia amboinensis 
Vesicularia angustifolia 
Vesicularia anisothecia 
Vesicularia aperta 
Vesicularia aquatilis 
Vesicularia argentinica 
Vesicularia ayresii 
Vesicularia bescherellei 
Vesicularia borealis 
Vesicularia brachytheciopsis 
Vesicularia buruensis 
Vesicularia caloblasta 
Vesicularia calodictyon 
Vesicularia caloosiensis 
Vesicularia chlorotica 
Vesicularia codonopyxis 
Vesicularia combae 
Vesicularia conostega 
Vesicularia crassicaulis 
Vesicularia crassiramea 
Vesicularia cruegeri 
Vesicularia cuspidata 
Vesicularia debilis 
Vesicularia demangei 
Vesicularia dubyana 
Vesicularia ectropotheciopsis 
Vesicularia elegantula 
Vesicularia eligiana 
Vesicularia eurycladia 
Vesicularia eurydictyon 
Vesicularia ferriei 
Vesicularia firma 
Vesicularia flaccida 
Vesicularia flavo-viridis 
Vesicularia fonticola 
Vesicularia galerulata 
Vesicularia glaucina 
Vesicularia glaucissima 
Vesicularia glaucopinnata 
Vesicularia glaucula 
Vesicularia glazioviana 
Vesicularia golungensis 
Vesicularia hainanensis 
Vesicularia hamata 
Vesicularia hapalyptera 
Vesicularia hilliana 
Vesicularia hygrobium 
Vesicularia immunda 
Vesicularia immutata 
Vesicularia inflectens 
Vesicularia inundata 
Vesicularia ischyropteris 
Vesicularia isopterygiiforme 
Vesicularia janowskyi 
Vesicularia kurzii 
Vesicularia latiramea 
Vesicularia lepervanchei 
Vesicularia leptoblasta 
Vesicularia leucocladium 
Vesicularia levieri 
Vesicularia lonchocormus 
Vesicularia longo-fluitans 
Vesicularia loricatifolia 
Vesicularia marginata 
Vesicularia mayumbensis 
Vesicularia meyeniana 
Vesicularia miquelii 
Vesicularia montagnei 
Vesicularia nanocarpa 
Vesicularia nigeriana 
Vesicularia nitidula 
Vesicularia nutans 
Vesicularia ochracea 
Vesicularia oedicarpa 
Vesicularia orbicifolia 
Vesicularia oreadelphus 
Vesicularia padangensis 
Vesicularia paranahybae 
Vesicularia paulensis 
Vesicularia pelvifolia 
Vesicularia perangusta 
Vesicularia perpallida 
Vesicularia perpinnata 
Vesicularia perreticulata 
Vesicularia perviridis 
Vesicularia pilifera 
Vesicularia piliretis 
Vesicularia plicaefolia 
Vesicularia poeppigiana 
Vesicularia pycnodontia 
Vesicularia reimersiana 
Vesicularia reticulata 
Vesicularia rhynchostegiocarpa 
Vesicularia rivalis 
Vesicularia rodriguezii 
Vesicularia rootii 
Vesicularia rotundifolia 
Vesicularia rutilans 
Vesicularia sarcoblasta 
Vesicularia scaturigina 
Vesicularia sigmangia 
Vesicularia sigmatellopsis 
Vesicularia slateri 
Vesicularia soyauxii 
Vesicularia sphaerocarpa 
Vesicularia squamatifolia 
Vesicularia stillatitia 
Vesicularia stillicidiorum 
Vesicularia stramineola 
Vesicularia strephomischos 
Vesicularia subcalodictyon 
Vesicularia subchlorotica 
Vesicularia subdenticulata 
Vesicularia subenervis 
Vesicularia subfuscescens 
Vesicularia subpilicuspis 
Vesicularia subsarcoblasta 
Vesicularia subscaturiginosa 
Vesicularia subsphaerica 
Vesicularia suburceolata 
Vesicularia succosa 
Vesicularia surinamensis 
Vesicularia tahitensis 
Vesicularia tenaci-inserta 
Vesicularia tenuatipes 
Vesicularia tepida 
Vesicularia terrestris 
Vesicularia thermalis 
Vesicularia thermophila 
Vesicularia thollonii 
Vesicularia tjibodensis 
Vesicularia tonkinensis 
Vesicularia tophacea 
Vesicularia trullifolia 
Vesicularia vesicularis 
Vesicularia vitiana

References

Hypnaceae
Moss genera